The Gulf of Aden (𐒅𐒖𐒐𐒕𐒌 𐒋𐒖𐒆𐒗𐒒) is a deepwater gulf of the Indian Ocean between Yemen to the north, the Arabian Sea to the east, Djibouti to the west, and the Guardafui Channel, Socotra and Somalia to the south. In the northwest, it connects with the Red Sea through the Bab-el-Mandeb strait, and it connects with the Arabian Sea to the east. To the west, it narrows into the Gulf of Tadjoura in Djibouti. The Aden Ridge lies along the centerline of the Gulf and is causing it to widen about 15mm per year.

The ancient Greeks regarded the gulf as one of the most important parts of the Erythraean Sea. It later came to be dominated by Muslims, as the area around the gulf converted to Islam. From the late 1960s onwards, there started to be an increased Soviet naval presence in the Gulf. The importance of the Gulf of Aden declined when the Suez Canal was closed, but it was revitalized when the canal was reopened in 1975, after being deepened and widened by the Egyptian government.

The waterway is part of the important Suez Canal shipping route between the Mediterranean Sea and the Arabian Sea in the Indian Ocean, with 21,000 ships crossing the gulf annually. This route is often used for the delivery of Persian Gulf oil, making the gulf an integral waterway in the world economy. Important cities along the Gulf of Aden include the namesake Aden in Yemen. Other Yemeni cities are Zinjibar, Shuqrah, Ahwar, Balhaf, Mukalla. On the Horn African side, the cities of Djibouti, Berbera and Bosaso.

Despite a lack of large-scale commercial fishing facilities, the coastline supports many isolated fishing towns and villages. The Gulf of Aden is richly supplied with fish, turtles, and lobsters. Local fishing takes place close to the shore; sardines, tuna, kingfish, and mackerel make up the bulk of the annual catches. Crayfish and sharks are also fished locally.

Historical Names

In antiquity, the modern-day Gulf of Aden was seen as an extension of the Erythraean Sea (Red Sea) , Erythrà Thálassa in Ancient Greek geography. The Greeks named several islands within the gulf, including Stratonis Insula, although it is no longer clear which existing islands had which Greek names.

In Abu'l-Fida's, A Sketch of the Countries, the present-day Gulf of Aden was called the Gulf of Berbera, which shows how important Berbera was in both regional and international trade during the medieval period.

Legendary navigator Ibn Majid referred to the Gulf of Aden as the Gulf of Berbera in his 15th century magnum opus The Book of the Benefits of the Principles and Foundations of Seamanship. In his description of the Somali coast and wider Indian Ocean he used the then contemporary reference to the Gulf as being named after Berbera like Abu'l-Fida before him. Berbera has been a prominent port since antiquity

Geography

Limits
The International Hydrographic Organization defines the limits of the Gulf of Aden as follows:

On the west – The southern limit of the Red Sea [A line joining Hisn Murad and Ras Siyyan].

On the west – The eastern limit of the Gulf of Tadjoura (A line joining Obock and Lawyacado).

On the East – The Arabian Sea.

Hydrography
The salinity of the gulf at  depth varies from 35.3 ‰ along the eastern Somali coast to as high as 37.3 ‰ in the gulf's center, while the oxygen content in the Gulf of Aden at the same depth is typically between 4.0 and 5.0 mg/L.

Exclusive economic zone
Exclusive economic zones in Gulf of Aden:

Economy

The Gulf of Aden is a vital waterway for shipping, especially for Persian Gulf oil, making it an integral waterway in the world economy.  Approximately 11% of the world's seaborne petroleum passes through the Gulf of Aden on its way to the Suez Canal or to regional refineries. The main ports along the gulf are Aden, Balhaf, Bir Ali, Mukalla, and Shokra in Yemen; Djibouti City in Djibouti; Zeila, Berbera, Maydh and Las Khorey in Somaliland and Bosaso in Somalia.

In antiquity, the gulf was a thriving area of international trade between Ptolemaic Egypt and Rome in the west and Classical India, its Indonesian colonies, and Han China in the east. It was not limited to transshipment, as Yemeni incense, tortoiseshell, and other goods were in high demand in both directions. After Egyptian sailors discovered the monsoon winds and began to trade directly with India, caravan routes and their associated kingdoms began to collapse, leading to a rise in piracy in the area.  The 1st-century Periplus of the Erythraean Sea documents one Egyptian captain's experiences during this era.

After the collapse of the Roman economy, direct trade ceased but the Awsan I port Crater, located just south of the modern city of Aden, remained an important regional center. In late antiquity and the early medieval period, there were several invasions of Yemen from Ethiopia; after the rise of Islam, the gulf permitted repeated migrations of northwest Africa by Arab settlers.

In the late 2000s, the gulf evolved into a hub of pirate activity. By 2013, attacks in the waters had steadily declined due to active private security and international navy patrols. India receives US$50 billion in imports and sends US$60 billion in exports through this area annually. Due to this, and for the sake of protecting the trade of other countries, India keeps a warship escort in this area.

Ecology

A geologically young body of water, the Gulf of Aden has a unique biodiversity that contains many varieties of fish, coral, seabirds and invertebrates. This rich ecological diversity has benefited from a relative lack of pollution during the history of human habitation around the gulf. However, environmental groups fear that the lack of a coordinated effort to control pollution may jeopardize the gulf's ecosphere. Whales, dolphins, and dugongs were once common before being severely reduced by commercial hunts, including by mass illegal hunts by Soviet Union and Japan in 1960s to 70s. Critically endangered Arabian humpback whales were once seen in large numbers, but only a few large whales still appear in the gulf waters,  including Bryde's whales, blue whales, and toothed whales inhabiting deep-seas such as sperm whales and tropical bottlenose whales.

See also

 Maritime Security Patrol Area
 International fleet of vessels in the Gulf of Aden

References

Further reading

External links

 Space Station photograph of the Gulf of Aden and the Horn of Africa

 
Bodies of water of Somalia
Bodies of water of Yemen
Great Rift Valley
Bodies of water of the Arabian Sea
Piracy by body of water
Aden
Bodies of water of the Red Sea
Bodies of water of Djibouti
Gulfs of Africa
Western Indo-Pacific